Niddrie or Niddry can mean:
Niddrie, Edinburgh, in Scotland, not to be confused with Longniddry in nearby East Lothian
Niddrie, Victoria, a suburb of Melbourne, Australia
Electoral district of Niddrie, an electoral district in Victoria, Australia
Niddrie, Ontario, Canada

Niddrie is also an alternate spelling of Niddry:
Niddry Castle, built about 1500, near Winchburgh, Scotland
Niddry Castle Oil Works, Scottish oil-shale factory, operational from 1903-1959
Longniddry, East Lothian, Scotland